Schuman is a Brussels metro station in the City of Brussels, Belgium. It opened as a premetro (underground tram) station on 17 December 1969 and became a full metro station on 20 September 1976, serving former lines 1A and 1B. Following the reorganisation of the Brussels Metro on 4 April 2009, it is served by lines 1 and 5, which cross Brussels from east to west.

The metro station is located under Schuman railway station, serving Brussels' European Quarter.

History
Schuman metro station first opened on 17 December 1969 as a premetro station (i.e. a station served by underground tramways). The metro then replaced the tramways on 20 September 1976. On 4 April 2009, metro operation was restructured and the station is now served by metro lines 1 and 5.

From 2008 to 2016, the metro and railway stations underwent major renovation works. The trains on new tracks now cross the metro hall, which also received a new glass roof, allowing more daylight into the station.

Area
This station is in the centre of Brussels' European Quarter, being adjacent to the Berlaymont building (headquarters of the European Commission), the Justus Lipsius building (used to hold low-level meetings of the Council of the European Union and provide office space to the Council's Secretariat) and numerous other EU offices. It is named after the area around the Robert Schuman Roundabout, which was itself named after Robert Schuman, one of the founding fathers of the European Union, the Council of Europe and NATO. It lies beneath the Rue de la Loi/Wetstraat, a major city thoroughfare, and is close to the Parc du Cinquantenaire/Jubelpark.

References

External links

 A peek on the future Schuman Station - December 9, 2007 ifrancis blog

Brussels metro stations
European quarter of Brussels
Railway stations opened in 1969
City of Brussels